Stability Pact can mean
 Stability and Growth Pact of the Economic and Monetary Union of the European Union
 Stability Pact for South Eastern Europe, an institution aimed at strengthening peace, democracy, human rights and economy in the countries of South Eastern Europe 1999-2008